Coxsackievirus and adenovirus receptor (CAR) is a protein that in humans is encoded by the CXADR gene.  The protein encoded by this gene is a type I membrane receptor for  group B coxsackie viruses and subgroup C adenoviruses. CAR protein is expressed in several tissues, including heart, brain, and, more generally, epithelial and endothelial cells. In cardiac muscle, CAR is localized to intercalated disc structures, which electrically and mechanically couple adjacent cardiomyocytes. CAR plays an important role in the pathogenesis of myocarditis, dilated cardiomyopathy, and in arrhythmia susceptibility following myocardial infarction or myocardial ischemia. In addition, an isoform of CAR (CAR-SIV) has been recently identified in the cytoplasm of pancreatic beta cells. It's been suggested that CAR-SIV resides in the insulin secreting granules and might be involved in the virus infection of these cells.

Structure 

Human CAR protein has a theoretical molecular weight of 40.0 kDa and is composed of 365 amino acids. The human CAR gene (CXADR) is found on chromosome 21. Alternative splicing is known to produce at least 2 splice variants known as hCAR1 and hCAR2 and are each composed of at least 7 exons. Pseudogenes of this gene are found on chromosomes 15, 18, and 21.

CAR is a transmembrane bound protein with two Ig-like extracellular domains, a transmembrane domain, a cytoplasmic domain, and two N-linked glycosylation sites. CAR contains two disulfide bonded loops (residues 35-130 and 155-220). The N-terminal segment comprises the two extracellular domains (D1 and D2). D1 is most distal from the membrane and contains a V/Ig-like fold whereas D2 is more proximal. The cytoplasmic tail of CAR contains the amino acids G S I V, which is characterized as a class 1 PDZ-binding motif for interacting with proteins containing PDZ domains.

The protein is found to be expressed in various regions of the body including the heart, brain, and, more generally, epithelial and endothelial cells. Moreover, CAR expression is not found in normal or tumor cell lines. Expression of CAR in endothelial cells can be regulated by treatment with drugs.

Function 
It functions as a homophilic and heterophilic cell adhesion molecule through its interactions with extracellular matrix glycoproteins such as: fibronectin, agrin, laminin-1 and tenascin-R.  In addition, it is thought to regulate the cytoskeleton through interactions with actin and microtubules. Moreover, its cytoplasmic domain contains putative phosphorylation sites and a PDZ-interaction motif which suggests a scaffolding role.

Cardiac
CAR is essential for normal development of cardiomyocytes. The expression of CAR is high in developing tissues, including the heart and brain; postnatally it is expressed in epithelial cells and in adult cardiac muscle, it is localized at intercalated discs. Knocking out CAR is embryonic lethal in mice by day 11.5, coordinate with severe cardiac muscle abnormalities including left ventricular hyperplasia, sinuatrial valve abnormalities, pericardial edema, thoracic hemorrhaging, myocardial wall degeneration, regional apoptosis, reduced density and disorganization of myofibrils, and enlarged mitochondria. Cardiomyocyte-specific deletion of CAR after embryonic day 11 had no noticeable effect on development and postnatal life, suggesting that CAR is critical during a temporal window of cardiac development.

It is clear from studies employing transgenesis that CAR function at intercalated discs in cardiac muscle is critical for normal heart function. Cardiac-specific knockout of CAR causes first degree block or complete block in the propagation of electrical conduction in the AV node. This was coordinate with the loss of connexin-45 at cell-cell junctions on the sarcolemmal membranes of AV node cells. Mice eventually developed cardiomyopathy associated with intercalated disc disorganization and loss of cardiomyocyte beta-catenin and ZO-1 expression; studies also showed that CAR, and connexin-45 form a protein complex that requires the PDZ-binding motif on CAR for proper formation. Moreover, CAR is required for normal localization of connexin-45, beta-catenin and ZO-1 at intercalated discs.

Studies from human hearts have shown that lower expression of CXADR mRNA is associated with a risk allele at chromosome 21q21, which may in fact predispose hearts to arrhythmias. To discern the mechanistic underpinnings, hearts from heterozygous CAR knockout mice subjected to acute myocardial ischemia were evaluated and showed slowed ventricular conduction, earlier onset of ventricular arrhythmias, and increased susceptibility to arrhythmias. These findings were coordinate with a reduction in magnitude of the sodium current at intercalated discs; CAR coprecipitated with NaV1.5, which may provide a mechanistic link to this finding.

Neural and lymphatic
CAR is strongly expressed in the developing central nervous system where it is thought to mediate neurite outgrowth. In addition, expression of CAR is  readily detectable in the adult nervous system.

It has also been shown that CAR is critical for the development of lymphatic vasculature and in forming lymphatic endothelial cell-cell junctions.

Clinical significance

CAR is a receptor for both Coxsackie B virus and adenovirus 2 and 5, which are structurally distinct.

In patients with myocarditis or dilated cardiomyopathy, elevated Coxsackie B2 viral nucleic acids have been detected in myocardial biopsy samples. Adenoviral genomic DNA has also been detected in myocardial biopsies of patients with idiopathic cardiomyopathy, or impaired left ventricular function of unknown origin. Patients exhibiting sudden death from acute myocardial infarction had a higher proportion of active coxsackie B virus infection relative to matched controls, which was coordinate with disrupted sarcolemmal localization of dystrophin, suggesting that enteroviral infection may worsen the outcome of patients with acute myocardial infarction.

A role for CAR in arrhythmia susceptibility and ventricular fibrillation after myocardial infarction was shown in that CXADR lies near the 21q21 locus, which is strongly associated with these insults.

Interactions 

CAR has been shown to interact with:
MAGI-1b,
PICK1,
PSD-95,
ZO-1,
NaV1.5

References

Further reading

External links 
 
 

Adenoviridae